Bagada spicea is a moth of the family Noctuidae first described by Achille Guenée in 1852. It is found in Sri Lanka.

References

Moths of Asia
Moths described in 1852
Condicinae